Stenaelurillus ignobilis is a jumping spider species in the genus Stenaelurillus that lives in Zimbabwe.

References

Spiders described in 2011
Spiders of Africa
Endemic fauna of Zimbabwe
Salticidae
Taxa named by Wanda Wesołowska